The Devil Makes Three may refer to:

 The Devil Makes Three (band), an American band
 The Devil Makes Three (film), a 1952 film